Røvika is a village in Molde Municipality in Møre og Romsdal county, Norway. The village sits along the Norwegian County Road 64, at the  eastern end of the Bolsøy Bridge. Røvik Church is located in the village.

References

Villages in Møre og Romsdal
Molde